Camping is a 1978 Dutch film directed bys Nolan Dow.

Cast 
 Joop Admiraal - Henk
 Yolande Bertsch - Jessica Bannink
  - Klaas
 Peter Faber - Guus
  - Vriend van Reina
  - 
 Marja Kok - Rita

External links 
 

Dutch comedy films
1978 films
1970s Dutch-language films